In the Quagmire is a 1927 Georgian Soviet Socialist Republic silent film directed by Ivane Perestiani.

Plot 
Vasily is an aspiring writer and Apollon works as a bank teller. They spend all their free time in the casino, and gambling starts to feel like an addiction. Apollon uses his government money for bets and ended up in prison. Vasily grieves the loss of his friend.

Cast
 Pavel Yesikovsky as Apollon Kazachkov
 Piotr Morskoy as Vasily Reztsov
 Maria Tenazi as Marusya 
 Ivan Kruchinin as Grandpa of Marusya  
 L. Privalov as Vasil Safonov 
 Marius Jakobini 
 Sofia Jozeffi
 K. Lavretski

References

Bibliography 
 Rollberg, Peter. Historical Dictionary of Russian and Soviet Cinema. Scarecrow Press, 2008.

External links 
 

1927 films
Soviet silent feature films
Georgian-language films
Films directed by Ivan Perestiani
Soviet black-and-white films
Soviet-era films from Georgia (country)